Crypsiptya coclesalis is a moth in the family Crambidae. It was described by Francis Walker in 1859. It is found in Japan, China and India and on Borneo and Java.

The wingspan 26–29 mm.

It is a major pest of bamboo, causing serious economic loss of growth and yield in nurseries, plantations and natural forests.

References

Moths described in 1859
Pyraustinae